HC 46 BEMACO Bardejov was an ice hockey team in Bardejov, Slovakia. Recently they have played in the Slovak 1. Liga, the second level of Slovak ice hockey. The team was founded in 1946.

Honours

Domestic

Slovak 1. Liga
  Winners (3): 2011–12, 2012–13, 2013–14
  Runners-up (1): 2015–16
  3rd place (2): 2009–10, 2014–15

Slovak 2. Liga
  Winners (1): 2006–07

Club names
 Sokol Bardejov – 1946
 Slavoj Bardejov – TBA
 Partizán Bardejov (1963–1985)
 Stavstroj TaSR Bardejov (1985–1992)
 HC-46 Bardejov (1992–2009)
 HC 46 BEMACO Bardejov (2009–2016)

References

External links
Official website (Slovak)

Sport in Bardejov
Bardejov
Ice hockey clubs established in 1946